Polina Leopoldovna Bayvel  (born 14 April 1966) is a British engineer and academic. She is currently Professor of Optical Communications & Networks in the Department of Electronic and Electrical Engineering at University College London. She has made major contributions to the investigation and design of high-bandwidth multiwavelength optical networking.

Education and early life
Bayvel was born into a Jewish family, and grew up in Kharkiv and Leningrad (now St. Petersburg) until 1978. Her father is the physicist Leopold P. Bayvel, her mother Raisa (Rachel) was a textile/pattern technologist/garment engineer and later published studies in Eastern-European Jewish history.

She was educated in England at Hasmonean High School for Girls and University College London where she was awarded a Bachelor of Engineering degree in 1986 followed by a PhD in 1990. In 1990, she was awarded a Royal Society Postdoctoral Exchange Fellowship in the Fibre Optics Laboratory at the General Physics Institute of the Soviet Academy of Sciences in Moscow.

Research and career
Bayvel's research has focused on maximising the speed and capacity of optical fibre communication systems, and the fundamental studies of capacity-limiting optical nonlinearities and their mitigation. She has made major contributions to the investigation and design of high-bandwidth, multi-wavelength optical communication networks.

She was one of the first to show the feasibility of using the wavelength domain for routing in optical networks over a range of distance- and time-scales. She has established the applicability of these new optical network architecture concepts, which have been widely implemented in commercial systems and networks. These systems and networks underpin the Internet, and the digital communications infrastructure – and are essential for its growth. A new project, the Initiate project, aims to test technologies that will make internet connections faster and more secure, which Polina Bayvel indicated will allow them to test them at a national scale. Her research has been funded by the Engineering and Physical Sciences Research Council (EPSRC).

Awards and honours
Bayvel won the Institute of Physics Clifford Paterson Medal and Prize in 2002. She was also elected a Fellow of the Royal Academy of Engineering in 2002 and was awarded the Institute of Electrical and Electronics Engineers (IEEE) Photonic Society Engineering Achievement Award in 2013. Bayvel was awarded an honorary Doctorate of Science degree in 2014 by the University of South Wales. In 2014 she delivered the Clifford Paterson Lecture and in 2015 was awarded the Royal Academy of Engineering Colin Campbell Mitchell Award. She was elected a Fellow of the Royal Society (FRS) in 2016. Bayvel was appointed Commander of the Order of the British Empire (CBE) in the 2017 New Year Honours for services to engineering.

In 2019 Bayvel was elected to the Board of Directors of The Optical Society, she began her three year term on 1 January 2020.

Personal life
Polina Bayvel has two sons.

References

1960s births
Living people
Fellows of the Institute of Physics
Fellows of the Royal Society
Female Fellows of the Royal Society
Fellows of the Royal Academy of Engineering
Female Fellows of the Royal Academy of Engineering
Commanders of the Order of the British Empire
Engineers from Kharkiv
21st-century women engineers
Fellows of Optica (society)
Ukrainian-Jewish emigrants to the United Kingdom
Women in optics